Corybas confusus, commonly known as the spider orchid is a species of terrestrial orchid endemic to New Zealand. It has a single heart-shaped leaf and a single dark green or light green flower with reddish maroon streaks and blotches and long, thread-like lateral sepals and petals. It grows in highland areas on both main islands.

Description 
The largest part of the flower is the dorsal sepal which arches and partly forms a hood over the labellum. The petals are similar to the lateral sepals but . Flowering occurs from October to December.

In flower, Corybas confusus can easily be mistaken for Corybas obscurus, as both species have a dark maroon coloration and a centrally green labellum. However, C. confusus has a heart-shaped to almost round leaf, while C. obscurus has a distinctly kidney-shaped leaf with prominent auricles at the base.

Taxonomy 
Corybas confusus was first formally described in 2016 by Carlos Lehnebach from a specimen collected near Lake Rotoiti in the Nelson Lakes National Park and the description was published in Phytotaxa. The specific epithet (confusus) refers to the similarity of the flowers of this species with those of C. obscurus and to the similarity of the leaf to those of C. macranthus and C. orbiculatus.

Distribution and habitat
It is found on both the North and South Islands and may also occur on Chatham Island.

Conservation
Corybas confusus is classified as "not threatened" by the New Zealand Government Department of Conservation Threat Classification System.

References 

confusus
Endemic orchids of New Zealand
Plants described in 2016